UC1 may refer to:

 
 , a German World War I submarine
 German Type UC I submarine of World War II
 , a Danish private electric sub

See also
 UC (disambiguation)